Bangabandhu Avenue is an urban road situated in Gulistan, Dhaka. Its former name is Jinnah Avenue. central office of Bangladesh Awami League is situated in Bangabandhu Avenue. The Dhaka grenade attack of 2004 happened in Bangabandhu Avenue.

History
Some year after Partition of India, a two-way road was built from this avenue to the airport. In the 1960s, Bangabandhu Avenue had many popular restaurants and eateries such as Chu Chin Chow, Kasbah, La Sani, Rex, Sweet Heaven, Salimabad Hotel etc. Bangabandhu Avenue witnessed various historical events in the politics of East Pakistan.

References

Further reading
 

Streets in Dhaka
Memorials to Sheikh Mujibur Rahman